The Knife That Killed Me is a young adult novel by Anthony McGowan, published in 2008. It was shortlisted for the Booktrust Teenage Prize, longlisted for the Guardian Award and longlisted for the Manchester Book Award.

Plot 
The Knife that Killed Me is a novel which follows a teenager, Paul Varderman, as he tries to fit in with a group in his school.

At the beginning of the book, Paul is a loner, looking into the groups from the outside. A series of events in which he stands up for members of a group known as "The Freaks" lead to him becoming included by them. "The Freaks" are different from the other groups as they do not live under the rule of the school thug, Roth.

As Paul becomes more involved with "The Freaks", he also begins to become influenced by Roth. Roth uses Paul as a messenger between himself and a rival school and gives him a knife. The relationship between the two schools develops, with Roth leading the way to war between them.

Summary 
Paul Vanderman could be at any normal high school where bullies, girls, and annoying teachers are just part of life. But “normal” doesn't apply when it comes to the school's biggest bully, Roth—a twisted and threatening thug with an evil agenda.

When Paul ends up delivering a message from Roth to the leader of a gang at a nearby school, it fuels a rivalry with immediate consequences. Paul attempts to distance himself from the feud, but somehow Roth keeps finding reasons for him to stick around. Then one day Roth hands him a knife. And even though Paul is scared, he has never felt so powerful.

References

2008 British novels
British young adult novels
British novels adapted into films